Stieff Silver Company Factory is a historic silver factory located at Baltimore, Maryland, United States. It is a two-story nine-bay rectangular brick factory building, designed by Theodore Wells Pietsch and built in two stages in 1925 and 1929.  The exterior features a lighted sign flanking a central clock that rises above a parapeted roof.  The Stieff Silver Company was the last of the Baltimore silverware manufacturers, operating between 1892 and 1999.

Stieff Silver Company Factory was listed on the National Register of Historic Places in 2000.

References

External links
, including photo from 1999, at Maryland Historical Trust
Stieff Silver Building – Explore Baltimore Heritage

Buildings and structures in Baltimore
Hampden, Baltimore
Industrial buildings and structures on the National Register of Historic Places in Baltimore
Industrial buildings completed in 1925